Kate Siobhan Nicholl (born 4 May 1988) is a Northern Irish politician who is an MLA for Belfast South and who served as the 79th Lord Mayor of Belfast from June 2021 until her election as an MLA in May 2022. She is a member of the Alliance Party of Northern Ireland. She was the first Lord Mayor in recent history not to be born in the United Kingdom or Ireland.

Early life
Nicholl was born in Marondera, Zimbabwe. Her father comes from County Down and her mother Helen comes from South Africa, where her family was involved in anti-Apartheid activism. They left Zimbabwe in 2000 when Kate was 12 after violence broke out, moving to Belfast. She studied at Methodist College Belfast, and worked as an advisor to the Alliance Party's Anna Lo.

Political career

Early career (2014-2021) 
Nicholl ran as one of two Alliance Party candidates, alongside Andrew Muir, for the constituency of Hollywood and Clandeboye in the North Down and Ards Borough Council, as a part of the 2014 local elections. She placed sixth; missing out on the fifth seat by just under 200 votes to the DUP's Jennifer Gilmore.

On 3 June 2016, Nicholl was co-opted onto Belfast City Council to fill the vacant position left after Paula Bradshaw of the Alliance Party was elected to the Northern Ireland Assembly in May 2016 to represent Belfast South. In May 2019, she was elected outright, topping the poll in the Balmoral constituency.

Lord Mayor of Belfast (2021-22)
She was sworn in as 79th Lord Mayor of Belfast on 1 June 2021, succeeding the Democratic Unionist Party's Frank McCoubrey. The theme for Nicholl's year as Lord Mayor was 'Our Belfast'. One of her first policies on becoming Lord Mayor was focusing on the health and well-being of children, and wanted to bring the views of young people into meetings. She has set a "monthly mayor's environmental challenge", working with organisations that improve the environment across Belfast.

Nicholl believes being a non-native of Northern Ireland is a positive, as it gives her an outsider view on events. In interviews, she has acknowledged the differences and conflict in Belfast, but hoped she would be able to unite people, saying "how the city – all of it – is ours". After her appointment as Lord Mayor, Nicholl was sexually harassed on social media over her condemnation of sexism and abuse on the Internet. She said that Alliance Party leader Naomi Long had faced similar harassment.

Nicholl was chosen as one of two Alliance candidates for Belfast South at the 2022 Northern Ireland Assembly election, alongside Paula Bradshaw.

The remaining three weeks of Nicholl's term as Lord Mayor was filled by Michael Long, the husband of Alliance Party leader Naomi Long. Long's three week term as Lord Mayor was the shortest term of office for any Lord Mayor of Belfast and was also the first time that the spouse of a former Lord Mayor has held the post.

Member of the Legislative Assembly (2022-)
On 7 May 2022, Nicholl was the final candidate to be elected for Belfast South, edging out incumbent Green Party MLA Clare Bailey. She is the first Zimbabwe-born MLA in Northern Ireland. After being forced to return to work soon after the birth of her daughter, Nicholl highlighted that "support simply doesn’t exist for women MLAs with babies and young children" as MLAs have no option for paid maternity leave like MPs are.

Personal life
Nicholl is married and has one son and a daughter. Nicholl gave birth to her first child, a son named Cian Luca Sherry, on 17 November 2019.
On 15 November 2021, Nicholl announced that she was pregnant with her second child, due to be born in May 2022, which would have made her the first Lord Mayor of Belfast to give birth while in office had she not resigned following her election as an MLA. On 30 May 2022, Nicholl gave birth to a daughter named Étaín Evelyn Sherry. She was named after Nicholl's grandmother Evelyn, who was involved in anti-apartheid activism as a member of the Black Sash in South Africa.

References

External links
 

1988 births
Living people
Alliance Party of Northern Ireland politicians
Lord Mayors of Belfast
People from Northern Ireland of South African descent
People from Marondera
Female members of the Northern Ireland Assembly
Northern Ireland MLAs 2022–2027
21st-century women politicians from Northern Ireland